The Autonomous study program for teacher training in Albanian language (Montenegrin: Samostalni studijski program Obrazovanje učitelja na albanskom jeziku, Albanian: Programi studimor per arsimimin e mesuesve ne gjuhen shqipe) is an autonomous study program of the University of Montenegro in Podgorica.

Teaching at the study program is realized by the teachers of the University of Montenegro – Faculty of Philosophy, the University of Tirana and the teachers of the University of Shkodër, according to the Agreement on Cooperation with the University of Montenegro.

References 

Autonomous study program for teacher training in Albanian language
Autonomous study program for teacher training in Albanian language
Montenegro
Albanian language
Teacher training programs
2000s establishments in Montenegro
2004 establishments in Serbia and Montenegro